Orobdella masaakikuroiwai is a species of proboscisless leech from Japan.

Etymology
The name is a contraction of Masaaki Kuroiwa, who was part of the survey of the Nagano Prefecture.

Description
The species has a flattened, elongate muscular body. The caudal sucker is positioned on the ventral surface. It has three pairs of eyes. General coloration is whitish brown, brown, or whitish yellow, with a greyish or yellowish white underbelly.

Range and habitat
O. masaakikuroiwai is found in mountainous parts of Honshu island, in the eastern and southeastern parts of the Nagano Prefecture. It was also found in mountainous areas of the Greater Tokyo Area and around Mount Amagi on the Izu Peninsula.

Individuals are usually found in moist areas, usually under stones or leaves.

Behavior

Reproduction
The species is believed to begin breeding in mid-to-late July.

Diet
Due to the discovery of soil particles in the leeches' digestive tracts, Nakano (2014) concluded that the species feeds on earthworms like other members of the genus Orobdella.

References

External links
 

Leeches
Endemic fauna of Japan
Invertebrates of Japan
Animals described in 2014